Ça Ira is a French song.  The name may also refer to:
Ça Ira (opera)
French ship Ça Ira (several ships)
Ca Ira, Virginia